Aleksandra Mirosław (née Rudzińska, born 2 February 1994) is a Polish speed climber and a two-time women's speed climbing world champion as well as the current women's speed climbing world record holder.

Early life

Mirosław is originally from Lublin, Poland. She started in sports at the age of seven and initially pursued swimming. She switched to speed climbing in 2007 being influenced by her older sister Małgorzata.

Climbing career

Competing as Aleksandra Rudzińska, she won the women's world championship speed climbing bronze medal at the 2014 IFSC Climbing World Championships in Gijón, Spain. She became the women's speed climbing world champion in September 2018 at the 2018 IFSC Climbing World Championships in Innsbruck.

Mirosław defended her world title and won her second women's speed climbing world gold medal a year later, at the 2019 IFSC Climbing World Championships in Hachioji, Japan. During the same competition Mirosław reached the finals of the combined event qualifying her for the 2020 Olympics. She won two stages of the IFSC Climbing World Cup in speed climbing, at Chamonix in July 2018 and at Wujiang in May 2019. Previously she finished in second place at Chamonix in July 2016, and third at Wujiang in October 2016.

On August 4, 2021, during the Tokyo 2020 Olympics she established the initial women's Olympic Record in speed climbing with 6.97 s. She improved her time in the finals on August 6, setting a new women's world record with 6.84 s. She finished in 4th place in the overall standings and did not win a medal.

On May 27, 2022, during the second qualification round of the IFSC Climbing World Cup in Salt Lake City, Utah, USA, she broke her own previous speed climbing world record with a time of 6.53 seconds.

Personal life
She previously competed under her maiden name, as Aleksandra Rudzińska. She is married to her coach, Mateusz Mirosław.

References

External links
Alexandra Mirosław, IFSC profile
 

1994 births
Polish mountain climbers
Living people
Polish rock climbers
Competitors at the 2013 World Games
Competitors at the 2017 World Games
Sport climbers at the 2020 Summer Olympics
Olympic sport climbers of Poland
Sportspeople from Lublin
IFSC Climbing World Championships medalists
IFSC Climbing World Cup overall medalists
Speed climbers